Alfonso Esparza Oteo (Aguascalientes, 2 August 1894 - Mexico City, 31 January 1950) was a Mexican composer. Esparza first success among Mexico City music fans was a foxtrot, and his music was enormously popular in the 1920s. Álvaro Obregón was listening to "El Limoncito", one of Esparza's compositions, when he was assassinated.

Works, editions and recordings
 Dime que sí (arranged by Efraín Oscher on Rolando Villazón: ¡Mexico! DG: 4779234)
 Un viejo amor (arranged by Gonzalo Grau on Rolando Villazón: ¡Mexico! DG: 4779234)

References

External links
 Alfonso Esparza Oteo recordings at the Discography of American Historical Recordings.

1894 births
1950 deaths
People from Aguascalientes
20th-century Mexican male singers